Transdev London formerly owned the following London Buses operators:

London Sovereign
London United Busways